The 1978 Merdeka Tournament was held in Malaysia from 12 to 29 July. South Korea won the tournament for the fifth time, beating Iraq in the final.

Matches

Final

References 

Merdeka Cup